This is a list of numbered roads in Northumberland County, Ontario, Canada. 

Northumberland